Sagri is a constituency of the Uttar Pradesh Legislative Assembly covering the city of Sagri in the Azamgarh district of Uttar Pradesh, India. It is one of five assembly constituencies in the Azamgarh Lok Sabha constituency. Since 2008, this assembly constituency is numbered 345 amongst 403 constituencies.

Election results

2022

2017

Bahujan Samaj Party member Bandana Singh served as the MLA who won in the 2017 Uttar Pradesh Legislative Assembly election defeating Samajwadi Party candidate Jairam Patel by a margin of 5,475 votes.

Members of Legislative Assembly

References

External links
Official Site of Legislature in Uttar Pradesh
Uttar Pradesh Government website
UP Assembly

External links
 

Assembly constituencies of Uttar Pradesh
Politics of Azamgarh district